Fritsla is a locality situated in Mark Municipality, Västra Götaland County, Sweden. It had 2,293 inhabitants in 2010.

Notable natives 
Arne Andersson (football player)
Lena Andersson (singer)
Yngve Brodd
Sten-Åke Cederhök
Gustaf Klarén
Hjalmar Lundbohm
Åke Söderblom
America Vera-Zavala

External links 
 Mark Municipality (Swedish)
 Fritsla.se (Swedish)

References 

Populated places in Västra Götaland County
Populated places in Mark Municipality